Magnus's green salt is the inorganic compound with the formula [Pt(NH3)4][PtCl4]. This salt is named after Heinrich Gustav Magnus, who, in the early 1830s, first reported the compound. The compound is a linear chain compound, consisting of a chain of platinum atoms. It is dark green, which is unusual for platinum compounds.

Structure
This species has attracted interest in materials chemistry and solid-state physics because of its one-dimensional structure.  It contains a chain of alternating [PtCl4]2− anions and [Pt(NH3)4]2+ cations, in which the platinum atoms are separated by  3.25 Å. It is a semiconductor.

Preparation
The compound may be prepared by combining aqueous solutions of  [Pt(NH3)4]2+ and [PtCl4]2−, which gives a deep green solid precipitate.  Under some conditions, this reaction affords a pink polymorph of Magnus's green salt.  In this so-called "Magnus's pink salt", the square planar Pt complexes are not stacked.

Related compounds
Magnus's green salt has the same empirical formula as cis-PtCl2(NH3)2 ("Peyrone chloride") and trans-PtCl2(NH3)2. These cis and trans compounds are molecules, whereas Magnus's green salt is a polymer.  This difference is manifested by the solubility of the molecular complexes in water, whereas Magnus's green salt is insoluble.

Soluble analogues of Magnus's green salt can be prepared by replacing the ammonia with ethylhexylamine.

The corresponding palladium compound ([Pd(NH3)4PdCl4]) is known as "Vauquelin’s salt".

History
Magnus's green salt was one of the first examples of a metal ammine complex.

References

Platinum(II) compounds
Metal halides
Ammine complexes
Chloro complexes
Inorganic polymers